Philotheos ("friend of God"), - derived from the original ancient Greek words philos meaning 'love' and theos meaning 'god'. The compound word therefore literally means love of God which may be translated "friend of God".  Note that the appropriate compound word with reference to 'gods' [plural] is polytheism.

God centred philosophy 
The word 'Philotheos' has existed for some time - reference, for example, the list of names under the headings "People" and "other" below as well as the original Greek used in the New Testament of the Christian Bible at 2 Timothy 3, 4. Since 2001, Philotheos has been used as the title of a Journal describing itself as 'The International Journal for Philosophy and Theology' - see the link below under the heading 'Other'. That Journal discusses philosophy and theology, with a special focus on the dialogue between the two. See Philotheos (journal) - Wikipedia 

In March 2021, the word 'Philotheos' was used for what is believed to be the first time as a name for a particular system of thinking. That system of thinking was asserted by Graham R.Catlin on the website platform at https://philotheos.org In response to Descartes cogito ergo sum, [I think therefore I am] Catlin asserted deus ergo sumus [God is therefore we are]. Catlin used the word 'philotheos' to describe a Supreme Being centred conception of philosophy in contrast to the current  anthropocentric [human centred] conception assumed since the prevalence of Enlightenment  Materialism. 

Catlin specifically asserts that the God centred philosophy he refers to as philotheos is based on the fundamental concept that God exists - and that the notion that God exists is the fundamental and determining characteristic of God: reference the assertion recorded in the book of Exodus in the Bible, chapter 3, verse 14 where the name of God is recorded as  "I AM". This definition is valid in all 3 of the world's major monotheistic religions: Judaism, Christianity and Islam. It is in accordance with this definition that the nature and activity of God is predicated: Omnipresence; omnipotence; Omniscience - all present, all powerful, all knowing. These are the essential attributes of the concept of one supreme Being ie God who must necessarily be conceived of as quintessentially and definitively "I AM".  

Given this simple and fundamental premise about God, Catlin calls the framework of thinking and terminology [the paradigm] which necessarily arises, philotheism - a system derived from the basic concept of philotheos.  

Catlin regards Theology - see Theology - Wikipedia - as being effectively now a discipline within Philosophy, adopting the approach and methods of anthropocentric, materialistic Philosophy - see Philosophy - Wikipedia    By contrast,  Philotheos/ism is predicated on the premise of God being "I AM" and therefore all consideration of the subject of God should be consistent with that conception, not by reference to comparative religion or trends of thought in theology over time. If God exists, God by definition remains constant and consistent; God does not change according to changing conceptions arising in different cultures and at different periods of history.   

By taking the premise of God as true, the philotheist answers the fundamental questions of human existence, including the philosopher's question: "Where does God come from ?" Catlin answers this question at https://philotheos.org/index.php/philotheism  The word philotheist necessarily describes a person who adheres to the fundamental concept of philotheos and its associated paradigm philotheism. Graham R. Catlin was the first to use the 3 words philotheos, philotheism and philotheist with reference to a system of theocentric philosophy which he describes at www.philotheos.org That philosophy is both internally coherent and also consistent with the essential meaning of those 3 words in the ancient Greek language.

People 

 Philotheos Bryennios (1833–1918), Greek Orthodox bishop
 Pope Philotheos of Alexandria, in office 979-1003
 Philotheus of Pskov (1465–1542), Russian abbot
 Philotheus of Samosata, a companion in martyrdom of Romanus of Samosata
 Patriarch Philotheus I of Constantinople (c. 1300-1379)
 a Byzantine court official, the author of the Kletorologion treatise, written in 899
 Saint Philotheos

Other 
 Philotheos: International Journal for Philosophy and Theology, founded in 2001 and based at Belgrade
 Philotheou Monastery on Mt Athos

See also
Filotije, Serbian variant